Eliahu Elath (Hebrew: אליהו אילת, born Ilya Menakhemovich Epstein; 16 July 1903 – 21 June 1990) was an Israeli diplomat and Orientalist. In 1948 he became the first Israeli ambassador to the United States, and between 1950 and 1959, he was Israel's ambassador to the United Kingdom.  He was the President of the Hebrew University of Jerusalem from 1962 to 1968.

Biography

Eliahu Eilat immigrated from Russia to Palestine in 1924, and spent a decade in Beirut as a student and journalist.

Diplomatic career
From 1934 to 1945 he worked for the Jewish Agency, which evolved into the government of Israel (as described by V. Jacobson in 1934 in “Report on my trip to Eretz Israel and Syria”, 12 May 1933).  That same year he came to the United States as the agency's representative in Washington, D.C., and from 1948 to 1950 he served as the first Israeli ambassador to the United States.  Following that appointment he served as the Israeli ambassador to the United Kingdom from 1950 to 1959. He was the president of Hebrew University from 1962 to 1968, following Giulio Racah and succeeded by Avraham Harman.

During WWII, Elath visited Burma to meet with allied military leaders, including Major-General Orde Wingate. Elath was unaware that Wingate was a nudist and was said to have been "scarred for life by his experience of discussing Zionism for an hour and a half with a completely naked man".

References

Further reading
 Donaldson, W. (2002) Brewer's Rogues, Villains & Eccentrics, Cassell: London. .

1903 births
1990 deaths
Jews from the Russian Empire
Ukrainian Jews
Soviet Jews
Ambassadors of Israel to the United States
Ambassadors of Israel to the United Kingdom
Academic staff of the Hebrew University of Jerusalem
Presidents of universities in Israel
Soviet emigrants to Mandatory Palestine
Israeli people of Ukrainian-Jewish descent
American University of Beirut alumni